Jean-Claude Brisseau (17 July 1944 – 11 May 2019) was a French filmmaker best known for his 2002 film Secret Things ("Choses Secrètes") and his 2006 film The Exterminating Angels ("Les Anges exterminateurs").

His film Céline was nominated for the Golden Bear Award at the 42nd Berlin International Film Festival. 

At the Cannes Film Festival, he was awarded the France Culture Award in 2003 for Secret Things; in 1988 he was awarded the Special Award for the Youth.

In 2002, Brisseau was arrested on charges of sexual harassment after three women came forward accusing him of cajoling them into performing sexual acts on camera by promising them a film role. He was eventually found guilty, fined and given a suspended one-year prison sentence. Brisseau made a semi-autobiographical film in 2006 about this incident, Les Anges Exterminateurs.

He was formerly a professor at La Fémis in Paris.

Brisseau died in Paris on 11 May 2019 at the age of 74.

Filmography
Dimanche après-midi (1967)
Des jeunes femmes disparaissent (1973) (Short film black and white)
La Croisée des chemins (1975)
Médiumnité (Mediumship) (1978) (https://www.youtube.com/watch?v=_5ezDPMg_28 [archive])
La vie comme ça (Life The Way It Is) (1978)
Un jeu brutal (A Brutal Game) (1983)
De bruit et de fureur (Sound and Fury) (1988)
Noce blanche (White Wedding) (1989)
Céline (1992)
L'Ange Noir (The Black Angel) (1994)
Les Savates du bon Dieu (Workers for the Good Lord) (2000)
Choses Secrètes (Secret Things) (2002)
Les Anges Exterminateurs (Exterminating Angels) (2006)
À l'aventure (2008)
La fille de nulle part (The Girl from Nowhere) (2012)
Des jeunes femmes disparaissent (2014) (Short film. Remake of the first in 1973)
''Que le diable nous emporte (2018)

References

External links

 Foco - Revista de Cinema, special edition devoted to Jean-Claude Brisseau

1944 births
2019 deaths
Film directors from Paris
French people convicted of sexual assault